Tennis competitions at the 2017 Islamic Solidarity Games was held from 12 to 22 May 2017 at the Baku Tennis Academy, Azerbaijan.

Medal events

Medal table

Men's singles

Finals

Top half

Bottom half

Women's singles

Finals

Top half

Bottom half

Men's doubles

Women's doubles

Men's team

Group A

Source: Islamic Solidarity Games

Group B

Source: Islamic Solidarity Games

Bronze medal match

Gold medal match

Women's team

Table

Source: Islamic Solidarity Games

References

External links 
Results

2017 Islamic Solidarity Games
2017
Islamic Solidarity Games
Tennis tournaments in Azerbaijan